The Special Interest Group on Computer–Human Interaction (SIGCHI) is one of the Association for Computing Machinery's special interest groups which is focused on human–computer interactions (HCI).

It hosts the flagship annual international HCI conference, CHI, with over 3,000 attendees, and publishes ACM Interactions and ACM Transactions on Computer-Human Interaction (TOCHI). It also sponsors over 20 specialized conferences and provides in-cooperation support to over 30 conferences.

SIGCHI has two membership publications, the ACM TechNews - SIGCHI Edition and ACM Interactions. Until 2000, the SIGCHI Bulletin was also published as a membership publication.

History 
SIGCHI was formed in 1982 by renaming and refocusing the Special Interest Group on Social and Behavioral Computing (SIGSOC). Lorraine Borman, previously editor of the SIGSOC Bulletin, was its first chair.

The formation of the ACM SIGCHI was first publicly announced in 1982 during the Human Factors in Computer Systems conference in Gaithersburg, Maryland, US, organized by Bill Curtis and Ben Shneiderman.  
The inugural CHI conference was hosted the year after, in 1983.
In 1988, the UIST and CSCW conferences were added.

Awards
Each year SIGCHI inducts around 7 or 8 people into the CHI Academy, honouring them for their significant contribution to the field of human–computer interaction.  It also gives out a CHI Lifetime Achievement Award for research and practice, the CHI Lifetime Service Award, and the CHI Social Impact Award. Since 2018, SIGCHI also awards the Outstanding Dissertation Award to recognize excellent thesis by Ph.D. recipients in HCI.

SIGCHI Lifetime Achievement Award
1998 - Douglas C. Engelbart (award called the SIGCHI Special Recognition Award in 1998)
2000 - Stuart K. Card
2001 - Ben Shneiderman
2002 - Donald A. Norman
2003 - John M. Carroll
2004 - Tom Moran
2005 - Tom Landauer
2006 - Judith S. Olson and Gary M. Olson
2007 - James D. Foley
2008 - Bill Buxton
2009 - Sara Kiesler
2010
 Practice: Karen Holtzblatt
 Research: Lucy Suchman
2011
 Practice: Larry Tesler
 Research: Terry Winograd
2012
 Practice: Joy Mountford
 Research: Dan R. Olsen, Jr.
2013
 Practice: Jakob Nielsen
 Research: George G. Robertson
2014
 Practice: Gillian Crampton Smith
 Research: Steve Whittaker
 Special Recognition: Ted Nelson
2015
 Practice: Susan M. Dray
 Research: James D. Hollan
 2016
 Practice: Jeff A. Johnson
 Research: Robert E. Kraut
 2017
 Practice: Ernest Edmonds
 Research: Brad A. Myers
 2018
 Practice: Arnold M. Lund
 Research: Steven K. Feiner
 2019
 Practice: Daniel Rosenberg
 Research: Hiroshi Ishii
 2020
 Practice: David Canfield Smith
 Research: Susan T. Dumais
 2021
 Practice: John T. Richards
 Research: Scott Hudson
 2022
 Practice: Steven Pemberton
 Research: Yvonne Rogers
 2023
 Practice: Deborah J. Mayhew
 Research: Gregory Abowd

SIGCHI Lifetime Service Award
2001 - Austin Henderson
2002 - Dan R. Olsen, Jr.
2003 - Lorraine Borman
2004 - Robin Jeffries and Gene Lynch
2005 - Gary Perlman, Marilyn Mantei Tremaine, Sara Bly, Don J. Patterson, and John Morris
2006 - Susan M. Dray
2007 - Richard I. Anderson
2008 - John Karat and Marian Williams
2009 - Clare-Marie Karat and Steven Pemberton
2010 - Mary Czerwinski
2011 - Arnie Lund and Jim Miller
2012 - Michael Atwood and Kevin Schofield
2013 - Joseph A. Konstan
2014 - Wendy Mackay and Tom Hewett
2015 - Michel Beaudouin-Lafon and Jean Scholtz
2016 - Gary M. Olson and Gerrit van der Veer
2017 - Scott E. Hudson and Zhengjie Liu
2018 - Maria Francesca Constabile and John C. Thomas
2019 - Bill Hefley
2020 - Gilbert Cockton and Catherine Plaisant
2021 - Wendy Kellogg and Philippe Palanque
2022 - Geraldine Fitzpatrick
2023 - Elizabeth Churchill and Loren Terveen

SIGCHI Social Impact Award
2005 - Gregg Vanderheiden
2006 - Ted Henter
2007 - Gregory Abowd and Gary Marsden
2008 - Vicki Hanson
2009 - Helen Petrie
2010 - Ben Bederson and Allison Druin
2011 - Allen Newell and Clayton Lewis
2012 - Batya Friedman
2013 - Sara J. Czaja
2014 - Richard E. Ladner
2015 - Leysia Palen
2016 - Jonathan Lazar
2017 - Jacob O. Wobbrock and Indrani Medhi Thies
2018 - Lorrie Faith Cranor 
2019 - Gillian R. Hayes
2020 - Ronald M. Baecker and Bonnie Nardi
2021 - Maria Cecília Calani Baranauskas, Andy Dearden and Juan Gilbert
2022 - Liz Gerber, Jennifer Mankoff and Aaditeshwar Seth
2023 - Shaowen Bardzell, Munmun de Choudhury and Nicola Dell

SIGCHI Outstanding Dissertation Award
2018 - Stefanie Mueller and Blase Ur
2019 - Chris Elsden, Anna Maria Feit and Robert Xiao
2020 - Katta Spiel and Paul Strohmeier
2021 - Josh Andres, Arunesh Mathur and Qian Yang
2022 - Aakash Gautam, Fred Hohman and Anna Lisa Martin-Niedecken
2023 - Megan Hofmann,  Dhruv Jain, Kai Lukoff

SIGCHI Executive Committee

SIGCHI is governed by a set of by-laws and SIGCHI’s Elected Officers are the President, the Executive Vice-President, the Vice-President for Membership and Communications, the Vice-President for Finance, and two Vice-Presidents at large. The Executive Committee (EC) also includes editors of membership publications and appointed officers including the Vice-President for Publications, the Vice-President for Conferences, the Vice-President for Chapters, the Vice-President for Operations, and the immediate past Chair.

2009–2012 
President: Gerrit van der Veer

2012–2015 
President: Gerrit van der Veer

2015–2018 
From July 2015 to July 2018, the SIGCHI President was Loren Terveen of GroupLens Research at the University of Minnesota and the Vice President was Helena Mentis of University of Maryland Baltimore County

2018–2021 
From July 2018 to July 2021, the SIGCHI President was Helena Mentis of University of Maryland Baltimore County with Vice President Cliff Lampe of University of Michigan.

2021–2024 
The current SIGCHI President is Neha Kumar with Vice President Shaowen Bardzell.  The President and VP run as a team and were elected to the positions for a three-year term.

Sponsored Conferences
Apart from CHI, SIGCHI sponsors or co-sponsors over 20 specialized conferences in topics related to HCI.
 ACM Conference on Supporting Groupwork (GROUP)
 International Conference on Tangible, Embedded and Embodied Interaction (TEI)
 International Conference on Intelligent User Interfaces (IUI)
 ACM/IEEE International Conference on Human Robot Interaction (HRI)
 Symposium on Eye Tracking Research and Applications (ETRA)
 ACM International Conference on Interactive Media Experiences (IMX)
 Collective Intelligence (CI)
 Interaction, Design and Children (IDC)
 ACM SIGCHI Symposium on Engineering Interactive Computing Systems (EICS)
 Designing Interactive Systems Conference (DIS)
 International Conference on User Modeling, Adaptation, and Personalization (UMAP)
 ACM International Joint Conference on Pervasive and Ubiquitous Computing (Ubicomp)
 International Conference on Automotive User Interfaces and Interactive Vehicular Applications (AutomotiveUI)
 ACM Conference on Recommender Systems (RecSys)
 International Conference on Human-Computer Interaction with Mobile Devices and Services (MobileHCI)
 Computer-Supported Cooperative Work (CSCW)
 ACM Symposium on User Interface Software and Technology (UIST)
 International Conference on Multimodal Interaction (ICMI)
 Symposium on Spatial User Interaction (SUI)
 ACM Symposium and Virtual Reality Software and Technology
 Symposium on Computer-Human Interaction in Play (CHIPLAY)
 Interactive Surfaces and Spaces (ISS)
 Creativity and Cognition (C&C)

Grants 
SIGCHI provides resources for the community to expand, grow and communicate in the form of Grants.

 SIGCHI Development Fund: Intended to support community-led initiatives to spur communication among local communities. 
 SIGCHI Early Career Mentoring fund: to support early-career scholars to participate in a meeting for mentorship. 
 SIGCHI Student Travel Grants: to provide students the opportunity to attend any of the SIGCHI Conferences.

References

External links
ACM
SIGCHI

Organizations established in 1982
Association for Computing Machinery Special Interest Groups
Human–computer interaction